The men's 110 metres hurdles at the 1992 Summer Olympics in Barcelona, Spain took place on 2 and 3 August 1992. Thirty-nine athletes from 27 nations competed. The maximum number of athletes per nation had been set at 3 since the 1930 Olympic Congress. The event was won by Mark McKoy of Canada, the nation's second title in the event and first since 1920. It broke a two-Games streak of American victories.

Background

This was the 22nd appearance of the event, which is one of 12 athletics events to have been held at every Summer Olympics. Five finalists from 1988 returned: silver medalist Colin Jackson of Great Britain, fourth-place finisher Vladimir Shishkin of the Soviet Union, sixth-place finisher Tony Jarrett of Great Britain, seventh-place finisher Mark McKoy of Canada, and eighth-place finisher Arthur Blake of the United States. For the third straight Games, Greg Foster of the United States was the reigning world champion; for the second straight Games, he did not make the American Olympic team. McKoy, the 1982 and 1986 Commonwealth champion, was the favorite, though both the United States and Great Britain teams were strong and deep.

Bahrain, Latvia, the Netherlands Antilles, and Sierra Leone each made their first appearance in the event; some former Soviet republics appeared for the only time as the Unified Team. The United States made its 21st appearance, most of any nation (having missed only the boycotted 1980 Games).

Competition format

The competition used the four-round format previously used in 1960 and 1988, still using the eight-man semifinals and finals used since 1964. The "fastest loser" system, also introduced in 1964, was used in the first two rounds.

The first round consisted of five heats, with 7 or 8 hurdlers each. The top four hurdlers in each heat, along with the four next fastest overall, advanced to the quarterfinals. Because of a tie, there were actually five "fastest losers" advanced. The 25 quarterfinalists were divided into three heats of 8 hurdlers each (with one having an extra), with the top four in each heat as well as the next four overall advancing. The 16 semifinalists were divided into two semifinals of 8 hurdlers each; again, the top four hurdlers in each advanced to the 8-man final.

Records

These were the standing world and Olympic records (in seconds) prior to the 1992 Summer Olympics.

No new world or Olympic records were set during the competition.

Schedule

All times are Central European Summer Time (UTC+2)

Results

Round 1

Heat 1

Heat 2

Heat 3

Heat 4

Heat 5

Overall results for round 1

Quarterfinals

Quarterfinal 1

Quarterfinal 2

Quarterfinal 3

Semifinals

Semifinal 1

Semifinal 2

Final

The final was held on August 3, 1992.

See also
 1988 Men's Olympic 110m Hurdles (Seoul)
 1990 Men's European Championships 110m Hurdles (Split)
 1991 Men's World Championships 110m Hurdles (Tokyo)
 1993 Men's World Championships 110m Hurdles (Stuttgart)
 1994 Men's European Championships 110m Hurdles (Helsinki)

References

External links
 Official Report
 Results

H
Sprint hurdles at the Olympics
Men's events at the 1992 Summer Olympics